Mikko Hakkarainen (born November 17, 1976) is a Finnish former professional ice hockey centre. He is currently working as team manager of Jukurit of Liiga.

Hakkarainen played a total of 263 games in the SM-liiga, playing for KalPa, SaiPa and JYP from 2005 to 2010.

Career statistics

References

External links

1976 births
Living people
Finnish ice hockey centres
Iisalmen Peli-Karhut players
JYP Jyväskylä players
KalPa players
Mikkelin Jukurit players
People from Iisalmi
SaiPa players
SaPKo players
Sportspeople from North Savo